Georges Plains railway station is a heritage-listed former railway station and now private residence located on the Main Western railway at Georges Plains in the Bathurst Region local government area in New South Wales, Australia. The former railway station was added to the New South Wales State Heritage Register on 2 April 1999.

History 

The station opened on 1 November 1876. Its date of closure is unknown.

Description 

The brick station building is a type 1, sub-type 2 building dating from 1876.

The platform faces are made of brick. The dock platform also survives.

The timber, skillion roofed signal box dates from 1913.

The platform signs and some station plantings are also within the heritage listing.

There is also a timber shed within the station precinct.

The station was reported to be in fair to good condition in 2005, with some loose roofing iron observed.

Heritage listing 

It is one of 6 similar structures to survive in an intact form, all of which had variations in expression and detail. Although the station building has been extended and minor changes have been made to the site it is a relatively intact small country station in good condition with an overall historic and visual unity that enhances its significance. The structures form, with the nearby classified Anglican church, a strong visual statement in the landscape and townscape particularly when viewed from the level crossing to the north.

Georges Plains railway station was listed on the New South Wales State Heritage Register on 2 April 1999 having satisfied the following criteria.

The place possesses uncommon, rare or endangered aspects of the cultural or natural history of New South Wales.

This item is assessed as historically rare. This item is assessed as scientifically rare. This item is assessed as arch. rare. This item is assessed as socially rare.

See also 

List of disused regional railway stations in New South Wales

References

Bibliography

Attribution

External links

New South Wales State Heritage Register
Bathurst Region
Disused regional railway stations in New South Wales
Houses in New South Wales
Articles incorporating text from the New South Wales State Heritage Register
Railway stations in Australia opened in 1876
Main Western railway line, New South Wales